Angelino Rosa (1948–2009) was an Italian professional football player.

He played 3 seasons (59 games, 2 goals) in the Serie A for A.S. Roma and Ternana Calcio.

His has the fifth-most appearances for Ternana Calcio in all leagues and second-most appearances in Serie A .

1948 births
2009 deaths
Italian footballers
Serie A players
Ternana Calcio players
A.S. Roma players
Venezia F.C. players
F.C. Matera players
Association football defenders